The ThinkPad E Series (formerly ThinkPad Edge) is a notebook computer series introduced in 2010 by Lenovo. It is marketed to small and medium-sized businesses.

Launch and reviews
The Edge series of ThinkPad computers was introduced at the 2010 International CES in Las Vegas and became available for sale in April of the same year.

For the Thinkpad Edge 13, a review on the Engadget web site said that even though, "it may not carry the premium features of [Lenovo Thinkpad] X301..., but for a budget ultraportable... [there is] little to complain about." Engadget also tested the battery life of the Edge 13 and discovered that "Lenovo's battery life prediction of seven hours is pretty on the mark." The Edge 13's battery lasted 5 hours and 12 minutes.

Laptop Magazine reviewed the Thinkpad Edge 14 and found it was "the most compelling 14-inch small business notebook on the market today."

NotebookReview reviewed the Thinkpad Edge 15 and said that its "build quality seems to be a step down from the 13 and 14 inch." The website also mentioned that the Edge series in general "feels under built...[and] the Edge 15 fares much worse".

Reviews of the E220s and E420s were more positive, citing better build quality than other models in the Edge line.

Features
The ThinkPad Edge series uses processors from both AMD and Intel. AMD processors offered include the Athlon II dual-core, the Turion II Dual-core, Phenom II Triple-core and Ryzen 2nd, 3rd, 4th and 5th Generation mobile Accelerated Processing Units (APUs). Intel processors used include the Core 2 Duo, Core i3, Core i5 and Core i7.

Voice Over IP (VoIP) features including high resolution cameras and an HD LED screen are also included. All four models offer a glossy LED back-lit 16:9 display capable of playing 720p video. However the Edge 11 and 13 does not include an optical drive. The laptops came in three colors: Midnight Black (Smooth), Midnight Black (Gloss), and Heatwave Red (Gloss).

Design
Lenovo designed the laptops to "reflect a new progressive and strikingly clean appearance while retaining ThinkPad durability and reliability". For example, along with the new Island-style keyboard, the Edge series had some keyboard design changes: uniform black keys and the removal of the embedded number pad. The Function keys were re-designed so users could use one finger to access functions such as multimedia keys. Some keys which were rarely used like SysRq were removed.

Models

Gen 1 (2010)

Edge 11

The ThinkPad Edge 11 laptop was not released in the United States, with the X100e serving as an 11-inch laptop solution in the US.
The laptop was 1.1 inches thick and weighed 3.3 lbs.
Like other laptops in the series, the Edge 11 was made available in glossy black, matte black and glossy red. Despite the low starting price, the Edge 11 laptop included some of the traditional ThinkPad durability features, including solid metal hinges.
The battery life was better than both the IdeaPad U160 and the ThinkPad X100e laptops.

Edge 11 (DER Special Edition)
A special edition laptop was provided for Australian Year 9 students as part of the Digital Education Revolution (DER) program in 2011.

Edge 13
The ThinkPad Edge 13 laptop was released on January 5, 2010. It was 1.2 inches thick, weighed 3.5 lbs (1.6 kg), and fit into a backpack. The Edge 13 laptop was capable of handling Windows 7 Pro with ease, with multiple applications like Firefox, Microsoft Word 2007, GIMP, TweetDeck, and iTunes at the same time. It did not feature Intel’s Arrandale platform on release, and was launched with an older generation CULV processor. The lack of processing speed, however, was compensated by a gain in battery life. The laptop delivered 6 hours and 58 minutes of battery life in MobileMark 2007 tests.

Specifications:

Processor: Intel Core2 Duo or Intel i3 380 or AMD Athlon Neo X2
Operating System: Microsoft Windows 7 Home Premium
Display: 13.3" Glossy (1366×768) TN 
Graphics: Intel GMA 4500MHD
Color: Midnight Black (Glossy, Matte), Heatwave Red (Glossy)
RAM: up to 8 GB DDR3 (1066 MHz) 
Storage: 250 GB 5,400 rpm SATA HDD
Networking: 10/100 Ethernet; Integrated Wireless 802.11abgn
Battery: 4- or 6--Cell Li-Ion (swappable)

Edge 14 and 15

The ThinkPad Edge 14 and 15 laptops were both launched on March 22, 2010. A web review noted build quality above average, yet not the same as professional grade ThinkPad laptops. One difference was smaller screen hinges which were plastic-faced instead of metal. While the Edge 14 laptop did not have a roll cage, it was still durable, with no flex on the palm rest, keyboard and touchpad.

The Edge 15 laptop was noted for having the same features as the smaller laptops in the series, with lower build quality. The right side of the palm rest displayed flex under moderate pressure. The keyboard tray also displayed slight inward flexing at the optical drive area. Some positive features included a keyboard that was noted as being very easy to type on. The touchpad was also noticeably easy to use, with fast response time, no discernible lag, even without adjustments. But also at the Lenovo support forum, lots of keyboard failures were reported. The price was viewed favorably, with user experience and feature set receiving praise.

Specifications:
Processor: Intel Core i5-560M; i5-460M; i3-390M; Mobile Intel 5 Series Dicrete GFX Chipset
Operating System: Microsoft Windows 7 Home Premium, or Professional (32 or 64-bit)
Display: 14.0", 16:9 HD (1366×768), LED-backlight; 15.6", 16:9 HD (1366×768), LED-backlight
Color: Midnight Black (Glossy, Matte), Heatwave Red (Glossy)
RAM: up to 8 GB DDR3 1066 MHz 
Storage: 320 GB (5,400/7,200 rpm), 500 GB (5,400/7,200 rpm) SATA HDD

Gen 2 (2011)

Edge E220s, E320, E325, E420, E420s
The ThinkPad Edge E220s and E420s were released in Spring 2011, as an updated, "more premium" line of the ThinkPad Edge. These newer series are significantly thinner, and include more of the traditional ThinkPad line of features such as the integrated 720p web-cam. Also notable is the return to use of metallic hinges versus the less durable plastic seen on earlier Edge models. Both the E220s and E420s can be configured with up to an Intel Core i7 processor, which offers a higher level of performance than other notebooks of this size category. The surfaces have been accented with a chrome finish around the exterior, and the addition of the "infinity glass" screen, which features edge-to-edge glass paneling on the display. Many design aspects of the E220s line have been seen in the recently unveiled ThinkPad X1, including the keyboard and touchpad design.

Edge E520, E525

Gen 3 (2012)

Edge 11" (E130, E135)

Edge 13" (E330, E335)

Edge 14" (E430, E430c, E431, E435)

The E430 is powered by second and third generation Intel Core processors with Intel HD Graphics or Nvidia Graphics. Battery life is increased with Nvidia's Optimus power management technology. Dedicated keys for controlling audio and video functions, Dolby Advanced Audio rated speakers, and an optional 720p camera were added to improve the experience for users of VOIP. The E430 makes use of USB 3.0 to improve data transfer speeds.

Edge 15" (E530, E531, E535)

Gen 4 (2013)

Like the parallel T-series models (T440/T540), Gen4 E-series do not have a touchpad\trackpoint physical buttons.

Edge 11" (E145)

Edge 14" (E440)

The ThinkPad Edge E440 was released in 2013, as an update to the ThinkPad Edge 430. The new E440 includes new Intel 4th Gen Haswell Processors and 1920x1080 FHD Screen options.

Edge 15" (E540, E545)
The ThinkPad Edge E540 was released in 2013, as an update to the ThinkPad Edge 530. The new E540 includes new Intel 4th Gen Haswell Processors, 1920x1080 FHD Screen options, and Nvidia Graphics

The ThinkPad Edge E545 was released in 2013, as an update to the ThinkPad Edge 535. The new E545 includes new AMD Richland Series APUs and AMD Graphics

Gen 5 (2014)

14" (E450, E455) 

The ThinkPad Edge E450 was released in 2015, as an update to the ThinkPad Edge 440. The new E450 includes new Intel 5th Gen Broadwell low power processors, 1920x1080 FHD Screen options, and new AMD R7 Mobile Dedicated Graphics.

The ThinkPad Edge E455 was released in 2015, as a new 14" ThinkPad with AMD Mobile APU Processors. The new E455 includes new AMD  Kaveri Processors, 1920x1080 FHD Screen options, and new AMD Graphics.

15.6" (E550, E555) 

The ThinkPad Edge E550 was released in 2015, as an update to the ThinkPad Edge 540. The new E550 includes new Intel 5th Gen Broadwell low power processors, 1920x1080 FHD Screen options, and new AMD R7 Mobile Dedicated Graphics.

The ThinkPad Edge E555 was released in 2015, as an update to the ThinkPad Edge 545. The new E555 includes new AMD Kaveri Processors, 1920x1080 FHD Screen options, and new AMD Graphics.

Gen 6 (2015)

14" (E460, E465)

The E460 and E465 have a 14-inch display and optionally come with a Windows 7 (Pro) or Windows 10 64-bit system.

The E460 uses Intel Skylake (6th Generation) processors.

The E465 is similar to the E460 but it uses an AMD processor.

15" (E560, E565)

The E560 and E565 have a 15.6-inch display and optionally come with a Windows 7 (Pro) or Windows 10 64-bit system.

The E560 uses Intel Skylake (6th Generation) processors.

The E565 is similar to the E560 but it uses an AMD processor.

Gen 7 (2016)

14" (E470, E475)

The E470 and E475 have a 14-inch display and optionally come with a Windows 10 64-bit system.

The E470 uses Intel Kaby Lake (7th Generation) processors.

The E475 is similar to the E470 but it uses an AMD processor.

15" (E570, E570c, E570p, E575)

The E570 and E575 have a 15.6-inch display and optionally come with a Windows 10 64-bit system.

The E570 uses the 7th Generation Intel Core processors.

The E575 is similar to the E570 but it uses an AMD processor.

The E570p was released in 2017 and has a high power CPU and mainstream GPU.

Gen 8 (2017)

14" (E480, E485)
The E480 and E485 have a 14-inch display and optionally come with a Windows 10 64-bit system. USB type-C is used for charging for the first time in the ThinkPad E series. The USB-C port can also connect to most USB-C docks allowing 4K display output, additional USB ports, networking, and charging from a single cable.

The E480 uses Intel Core processors (up to i7-8550U), and is equipped with the integrated intel UHD 620 graphics card or optionally the AMD RX550-2gb discrete graphics card. The E480 did not have adequate cooling system on the higher end models, especially those with the dedicated AMD RX 550 graphics card, leading to unit overheating. Lenovo released a firmware update that addressed the problem, but substantially limited the performance of the graphics card.

The E485 is similar to the E480 but it uses an AMD Ryzen processor. The AMD Ryzen processors use Radeon Vega integrated graphics which outperforms similar Intel integrated graphics.

15" (E580, E585)
The E580 and E585 have a 15.6-inch display.

The E580 uses Intel Core processors.

The E585 is similar to the E580 but it uses an AMD Ryzen processor.

Gen 9 (2018)
The Intel models were announced in 2018. The AMD ones in 2019.

14" (E490, E490s, E495)

The E490, E490s and E495 have a 14-inch display and optionally come with a Windows 10 64-bit system.

The E490 and E490s use 8th Generation Intel Core processors.

The E495 is similar to the E490 but it uses 3rd gen AMD Ryzen processor.

15" (E590, E595)

The E590 and E595 have a 15.6-inch display and optionally come with a Windows 10 64-bit system.

The E590 uses 8th Generation Intel Core processors.

The E595 is similar to the E590 but it uses an AMD Ryzen processor.

Gen 10 (2019)
The Intel models were announced in October 2019. The AMD ones in May 2020.

14" (E14)
The E14 has a 14.0-inch display and optionally come with a Windows 10 Home or Pro 64-bit operating system. It uses 10th Generation Intel Core or 3rd-gen Ryzen Mobile CPUs.

15" (E15)

The E15 has a 15.6-inch display and optionally come with a Windows 10 Home or Pro 64-bit operating system. It uses 10th Generation Intel Core or 3rd-gen Ryzen Mobile CPUs.

References

External links
 

Lenovo laptops
E series
Computer-related introductions in 2010